Midnight Revue is an East German musical film directed by Gottfried Kolditz and starring Christel Bodenstein, Manfred Krug and Werner Lierck. It was released in 1962.

References

Bibliography 
 Lutz Peter Koepnick. The Cosmopolitan Screen: German Cinema and the Global Imaginary, 1945 to the Present. University of Michigan Press, 2007.

External links
 

1962 films
East German films
1960s German-language films
Films set in Berlin
Films about composers
Films directed by Gottfried Kolditz
1960s German films